The Asa Biggs House and Site is a historic home and archaeological site located at Williamston, Martin County, North Carolina. It was built in 1835, and built as a two-story, side hall-plan, late Federal style frame dwelling.  It was later enlarged with a two-story, two bay, vernacular Greek Revival style addition and rear ell to form a "T"-plan.  It was the home of U.S. Congressman, Senator, and judge Asa Biggs (1811-1878).  The property is owned by the Martin County Historical Society.

It was added to the National Register of Historic Places in 1979. It is located in the Williamston Historic District.

References

External links
Martin County Historical Society

Houses on the National Register of Historic Places in North Carolina
Federal architecture in North Carolina
Greek Revival houses in North Carolina
Houses completed in 1835
Houses in Martin County, North Carolina
National Register of Historic Places in Martin County, North Carolina
Individually listed contributing properties to historic districts on the National Register in North Carolina